The Writer's Almanac is a daily podcast and newsletter of poetry and historical interest pieces, usually of literary significance. Begun as a radio program in 1993, it is hosted by Garrison Keillor and was produced and distributed by American Public Media through November 2017. It is also available as a podcast. Past program sponsors include The Poetry Foundation (using funds from a large bequest from philanthropist Ruth Lilly), publisher of Poetry Magazine and The Mosaic Foundation of Rita and Peter Heydon.

Each program is at least five minutes long and begins with the phrase "And here is the Writer's Almanac for [insert date here]". Each program includes vignettes about authors and other noteworthy people whose birthdays or significant events coincide with the program's date, as well as excerpts of important events in history. The program continues with one or more poems chosen by Keillor, and ends with Keillor's traditional sign-off, "Be well, do good work, and keep in touch." The program's theme music is a version of the Swedish song "Ge mig en dag", performed by Richard Dworsky on the piano. The original theme music was from Antonín Dvořák's Slavonic Dance, Op. 72, No. 8.

Written by Betsy Allister, Joy Biles, Priscilla Kinter, Heather McPherson, and Holly Vanderhaar, the program was engineered and edited by Thomas Scheuzger, Noah Smith, and Sam Hudson. Production assistance was by Kathy Roach and Katrina Cicala.

In 2005 the program was briefly canceled by Kentucky public radio station WUKY due to concerns about purportedly indecent content in some of the poems. The station reinstated the program after receiving an "outpouring of support" for it. The program was distributed in APM's Classical 24 stream and many stations that carry it air all or mostly Classical music during other times.

In November 2017, after allegations of inappropriate behavior by Keillor toward someone who worked for him on a freelance basis, Minnesota Public Radio terminated its contracts with him and his private media companies. This effectively ended the distribution and broadcast of The Writer's Almanac on public radio, as well as rebroadcasts of Keillor's A Prairie Home Companion.

In the spring 2018, Keillor restarted The Writer's Almanac on his website. In summer 2018, he added the option of subscribing to the newsletter version.

In April 2018, Minnesota Public Radio posted a message stating its intent to re-establish the online archives of The Writer's Almanac and A Prairie Home Companion: .

References

External links 
 The Writer's Almanac website for broadcasts released from 1993 through July 31, 2014
 The Writer's Almanac website for broadcasts released from August 1, 2014 and November 2017 (overlaps with previous site for July 18-31, 2014 broadcasts)
 The Writer's Almanac website for broadcasts starting on May 28, 2018

American Public Media programs
Audio podcasts
Arts podcasts
1993 radio programme debuts
2017 radio programme endings
Book podcasts